Nkodo Sitony (25 August 1959 – 21 December 2021) was a Cameroonian singer.

Life and career
Sitony was a popular singer of the bikutsi genre in the 1980s, and worked alongside Mongo Faya. He died at the Central Hospital of Yaoundé on 21 December 2021, at the age of 62.

Discography
Mba Mvoe
Metil Wa
Ngoan Ezoum
Wa Yi Ma Wo Ya

References

External links
 

1959 births
2021 deaths
20th-century Cameroonian male singers
Bikutsi
People from Douala